Michael Andrew Jace (born July 13, 1962) is an American convicted murderer and former character actor, best known for his role as Los Angeles Police Officer Julien Lowe in the FX drama The Shield. He also played Andre Tibbs, an ex-convict mover accused of murder, in an episode of Cold Case.

On May 20, 2014, Jace was arrested after he fatally shot his wife, April Jace. A jury subsequently convicted him of second-degree murder on May 31, 2016, and on June 10, 2016, sentenced him to 40 years to life in prison.

Career
Jace began his professional acting career in 1992, appearing in an episode of Law & Order. In 1994, he appeared in several TV shows, including Star Trek: Deep Space Nine, and films including Clear and Present Danger and Forrest Gump, where he portrayed the leader of the Black Panthers.

Jace's other film appearances include Strange Days, playing a bodyguard to a corrupt record executive; The Replacements, playing a prison inmate-turned-football player; The Great White Hype, playing antagonist Marvin Shabazz; Boogie Nights, playing Jerome; The Fan, playing an arrogant ticket scalper; and Tim Burton's Planet of the Apes remake, playing Major Frank Santos.

Jace's TV appearances include the 1995 HBO TV movie Tyson (as boxer Mitch Green), Cold Case, and the 1999 Fox Family Channel TV movie Michael Jordan: An American Hero (as Jordan).

In 2002, Jace was cast as Officer Julien Lowe on FX's hit show The Shield. He was part of the main cast and appeared in 88 episodes through all seven seasons.

After his role on The Shield, Jace appeared, uncredited, in the film State of Play with Russell Crowe. From 2009 to 2013, he had a small recurring role on the television series Southland.

Murder conviction
Jace was arrested by the Los Angeles Police Department on the evening of May 19, 2014, at his Hyde Park, South Los Angeles home, following a domestic violence report as well as Jace's own 9-1-1 call, in which he stated, "I shot my wife." When police arrived, they found Jace's wife, April, dead from gunshot wounds. After being questioned by police regarding his wife's death, Jace confessed to the shooting. 

On May 20, 2014, Jace was arrested and booked for her murder. On May 22, 2014, he was formally charged with murder by the Los Angeles County District Attorney's Office. On May 31, 2016, Jace was found guilty of second-degree murder. Notably, the LAPD was able to crack the password-protected security on April's iPhone 5C. On June 10, 2016, he was sentenced to 40 years to life in prison. He is incarcerated at the Corcoran State Prison.

Filmography

References

External links

Biography on Star Pulse

1962 births
20th-century African-American people
21st-century African-American people
Living people
20th-century American male actors
21st-century American criminals
21st-century American male actors
African-American male actors
American male film actors
American male television actors
American people convicted of murder
American prisoners sentenced to life imprisonment
Criminals from New Jersey
Male actors from New Jersey
People convicted of murder by California
Prisoners sentenced to life imprisonment by California
Actors from Paterson, New Jersey
Uxoricides